Papa Waly N'Diaye (born 10 April 1974) is a Senegalese footballer. He played in 15 matches for the Senegal national football team from 1993 to 1997. He was also named in Senegal's squad for the 1994 African Cup of Nations tournament.

References

1974 births
Living people
Senegalese footballers
Senegal international footballers
1994 African Cup of Nations players
Place of birth missing (living people)
Association footballers not categorized by position